Rifflsee is a lake of Tyrol, Austria. It is the largest lake in the Ötztal Alps. The mountain lake is located in the Kaunergrat west of the Pitztal and is a typical moraine reservoir. The lake fills an extensive valley, the glacier-turbid water looks greenish. It is framed in the north and west by rugged peaks of the Kaunergrat, particularly striking are Seekogel and Rostizkogel. In sunny and warm weather, a considerable amount of melt water is supplied by the Seekarles, Loch, and Rifflferner.

An alpine club hut called the Rifflseehütte is located nearby.

Images 

Lakes of Tyrol (state)

References